The 2010 Oklahoma gubernatorial election was held on November 2, 2010, to elect the governor of Oklahoma. Due to term limits established by the Oklahoma Constitution, incumbent Democratic Governor Brad Henry could not seek re-election. The race had been hotly contested by both political parties, with several well-known Oklahomans announcing their candidacy up to two years before the election. This was the first time a woman challenged another woman for Governor of Oklahoma. On November 2, 2010, Republican candidate Mary Fallin was elected in a landslide, defeating Democratic candidate Jari Askins.

As both parties nominated female candidates (Jari Askins for the Democrats and Mary Fallin for the Republicans; both of whom have also previously held the office of lieutenant governor), and as no third-party or write-in candidate qualified for the ballot, Oklahoma was guaranteed its first-ever female governor. Democratic governor Brad Henry was easily re-elected in 2006 and maintained the highest approval rating of any state official in Oklahoma. In 2008, Republicans made gains in the state legislature and took control of both the House and the Senate for the first time in Oklahoma history, thus election gave Republicans their first ever trifecta in the state. 

Askins carried only four counties: her home county of Stephens and neighboring Comanche, Cotton, and Jefferson. While Fallin carried the rest of the state, her margins varied, ranging from narrow wins in much of Eastern Oklahoma to a 66-point victory in staunchly Republican Beaver County.

Mary Fallin was the first Republican to win Atoka County, Choctaw County, Coal County, Haskell County, Hughes County, Johnston County, Latimer County, Le Flore County, McCurtain County, Okfuskee County, Pittsburg County, and Pushmataha County in a gubernatorial election since Oklahoma statehood. Fallin was the first non-Democrat to win Tillman County, which had voted for the Democratic candidate for governor in each election since Oklahoma statehood, thus breaking a 103-year streak of voting Democratic.

Democratic primary

Declared
 Jari Askins, incumbent Lieutenant Governor of Oklahoma
 Drew Edmondson, incumbent Attorney General of Oklahoma

Polling

Results

Republican primary

Declared
Mary Fallin, former lieutenant governor and current Congresswoman for Oklahoma's 5th congressional district
 Roger L. Jackson, retired businessman, former president of the Oklahoma Office Machine Dealers Association (OOMDA)
 Randy Brogdon, state senator
 Robert Hubbard, business owner of Piedmont, Oklahoma's "Hubbard Ranch Supply"

Declined
 J. C. Watts, former Congressman from Oklahoma's 4th congressional district
 Mick Cornett, Mayor of Oklahoma City

Polling

Results

General election

Predictions

Polling

Results

References

External links
Oklahoma State Election Board
Candidates for Oklahoma State Offices at Project Vote Smart
Campaign contributions for 2010 Oklahoma Governor from Follow the Money
Oklahoma Governor 2010 from OurCampaigns.com
Election 2010: Oklahoma Governor from Rasmussen Reports
2010 Oklahoma Governor Race from Real Clear Politics
2010 Oklahoma Governor's Race from CQ Politics
Race Profile in The New York Times
News coverage from The Oklahoman
Debates
Oklahoma Gubernatorial Debate on C-SPAN, July 21, 2010
Official campaign sites
Jari Askins for Governor
Mary Fallin for Governor

2010
Gubernatorial
Oklahoma